58 Ophiuchi is a single star in the equatorial constellation of Ophiuchus. It is visible to the naked eye as a faint, yellow-white hued star with an apparent visual magnitude of 4.86. This object is approximately 57.6 light years away based on parallax, and is drifting further from the Earth with a heliocentric radial velocity of +10 km/s.

This is an ordinary F-type main-sequence star with a stellar classification of F5V. It is 2.7 billion years old with a projected rotational velocity of 12 km/s. The star has an estimated 1.26 times the mass of the Sun and 1.3 times the Sun's radius. It is radiating three times the luminosity of the Sun from its photosphere at an effective temperature of 6,447 K.

References

F-type main-sequence stars
Ophiuchus (constellation)
BD-21 4712
Ophiuchi, 58
0692
160915
086736
6595